Coombe is a settlement in the English county of Kent. It lies between Ash-next-Sandwich and Woodnesborough.

According to Edward Hasted in 1800, it was a hamlet in the western section of the parish of Woodnesborough.

Coombe Lane passes through the small settlement between Ash towards New Street (heading to Woodnesborough). Coombe Lane Cottage is a Grade II Listed cottage on the lane.

Etymology
The village's name derives from Ancient Celtic cumbā "valley" which was taken into Old English. The name was recorded as æt cumban in 1005, the first word æt representing 'at'.

References

External links

Villages in Kent